Terbium compounds are compounds formed by the lanthanide metal terbium (Tb). Terbium generally exhibits the +3 oxidation state in these compounds, such as in TbCl3, Tb(NO3)3 and Tb(CH3COO)3. Compounds with terbium in the +4 oxidation state are also known, such as TbO2 and BaTbF6. Terbium can also form compounds in the 0, +1 and +2 oxidation states.

The trivalent terbium ion is generally colorless in aqueous solution, and when it is irradiated by certain wavelengths of ultraviolet light (such as 254 nm or 365 nm) in solution or crystal form, it will emit green fluorescence. This property has given rise to applications in fields such as optics.

Properties of terbium compounds

Chalcogenides

Oxides 

Terbium has a variety of oxides. The most easily obtained is terbium(III,IV) oxide, which can be produced by the decomposition of terbium compounds such as the hydroxide, the oxalate and the p-aminobenzoate. Terbium(III,IV) oxide, because the oxide contains both trivalent terbium and tetravalent terbium, can be produced by reacting with nitric acid to produce terbium nitrate, releasing oxygen in the progress:

 2 Tb4O7 + 24 HNO3 → 8 Tb(NO3)3 + 12 H2O + O2↑

It is refluxed in a mixture of acetic acid and hydrochloric acid, which can separate trivalent and tetravalent terbium:

 Tb4O7 + 6 HCl → 2 TbO2 + 2 TbCl3 + 3 H2O

It reacts with dicyandiamide at a high temperature to obtain Tb2O2CN2.

Another common oxide of terbium is terbium(III) oxide, which can be obtained from the reduction of hydrogen from terbium(III,IV) oxide at 1300 °C. A p-type semiconductor is formed after doping with calcium.

Terbium(IV) oxide can be prepared by treating terbium(III,IV) oxide with dilute hydrochloric acid, its hydrate TbO2·xH2O can be obtained by oxidizing terbium(III) hydroxide with potassium persulfate in the presence of silver nitrate. Terbium(IV) oxide can form mixed crystals with praseodymium(IV) oxide.

Other chalcogenides 

Terbium(III) sulfide is one of the sulfides of terbium, which can be obtained by reacting with sulfur in a stoichiometric ratio.
It can also be obtained by reacting terbium(III,IV) oxide with carbon disulfide and hydrogen sulfide at high temperature. It reacts with hydrofluoric acid solution to give terbium(III) fluoride hemihydrate. Terbium(III) selenide can be obtained by the reaction of terbium polyselenide TbSe1.9 with metal terbium, which can form black needle-like crystals with U2S3 structure and space group Pnma. Terbium monochalcogenides, TbZ (Z = S, Se or Te), can be prepared by directly reacting terbium with the corresponding chalcogen. These chalcogenides are black and have a NaCl structure. They have metallic conductivity and consist of Ln3+ and Z2- ions with 1 electron from each cation delocalized in a conduction band.

Halides and halogen complexes 

Terbium can form four trihalides in the form TbX3 (X=F, Cl, Br, I), which, except the fluoride, are easily soluble in water, and are strong electrolytes in water. They can be prepared by reacting terbium with the corresponding halogen:

 [a white substance]
 [a white substance]
 [a white substance]

Anhydrous terbium halides can be prepared by reacting oxides or halides hydrates:
 Tb2O3 + 6 NH4Cl → 2 TbCl3 + 3 H2O + 6 NH3↑
 TbCl3·6H2O + 6 SOCl2 → TbCl3 + 6 SO2↑ + 12 HCl↑

Terbium(II) halides are obtained by annealing Tb(III) halides in presence of metallic Tb in tantalum containers. Terbium also forms a sesquichloride , which can be further reduced to TbCl by annealing at 800 °C. This terbium(I) chloride forms platelets with layered graphite-like structure.

Terbium(IV) fluoride is the only halide that tetravalent terbium can form, and has strong oxidizing properties. It is also a strong fluorinating agent, emitting relatively pure atomic fluorine when heated, rather than the mixture of fluoride vapors emitted from cobalt(III) fluoride or cerium(IV) fluoride. It can be obtained by reacting terbium(III) chloride or terbium(III) fluoride with fluorine gas at 320 °C:
 2 TbF3 + F2 → 2 TbF4
When TbF4 and CsF is mixed in a stoichiometric ratio, in a fluorine gas atmosphere, CsTbF5 is obtained. It is an orthorhombic crystal, with space group Cmca, with a layered structure composed of [TbF8]4− and 11-coordinated Cs+. The compound BaTbF6 can be prepared in a similar method. It is an orthorhombic crystal, with space group Cmma. The compound [TbF8]4− also exists.

Organoterbium compounds 

Organoterbium compounds are a class of organic metal compounds containing Tb-C bonds. The cyclopentadienyl complexes of terbium were studied in the early stage. They can be prepared by the reaction of sodium cyclopentadienide and anhydrous terbium halide in tetrahydrofuran, such as:

 TbCl3 + 3 C5H5Na → (C5H5)3Tb + 3 NaCl
 TbI2 + 2 (C5HiPr4)Na → (C5HiPr4)2Tb + 2 NaI

However, this compound has limited usage and academic interest.

Like the other lanthanides, metal-carbon σ bonds are found in alkyls of terbium such as [TbMe6]3− and Tb[CH(SiMe3)2]3. The alkyls and aryls can be prepared by metathesis in tetrahydrofuran on ether solutions:

 TbCl3 + 3 LiR → TbR3 + 3 LiCl
 TbCl3 + 4 LiR → Li[TbR4] + 3 LiCl3

Other compounds

Oxoacid salts 

Terbium(III) sulfate can be obtained by the reaction of terbium(III,IV) oxide and concentrated sulfuric acid. It can crystallize colorless octahydrate crystals in water, which is isostructural with the corresponding praseodymium compound. The anhydrate can be obtained by heating the octahydrate, and an exothermic reaction occurs when the anhydrate is rehydrated. Terbium(III) hydroxide can be obtained by reacting terbium with water. It reacts with acids to produce terbium(III) salts. It decomposes to TbO(OH) at an elevated temperature, and upon further heating, will decompose to terbium(III) oxide.

Terbium(III) nitrate can be obtained by reacting terbium(III) oxide with nitric acid and crystallizing. The crystals are dried with 45~55% sulfuric acid to obtain the hexahydrate. The basic salt TbONO3 can be obtained by heating the hydrate, and its anhydrate can be obtained by the reaction of terbium(III) oxide and dinitrogen tetroxide. Terbium(III) phosphate can be obtained by the reaction of diammonium hydrogen phosphate and terbium(III) nitrate, and the reaction produces a hexagonal monohydrate, which can emit the characteristic green light of terbium (543 nm) under the excitation of 355 nm wavelength. It can also be obtained by the reaction of sodium phosphate and terbium(III) chloride in solution, and the precipitated dihydrate is calcined at 800 °C to obtain the anhydrous form. Terbium(III) arsenate is an orthorhombic crystal at 77  K with space group Fddd, and undergoes a phase transition at 27.7 K to form a tetragonal crystal with space group I41/amd, which is a ferromagnet below 1.5 K. It can be produced by reacting sodium arsenate and terbium(III) chloride. Terbium(III) antimonate (TbSbO4) is a monoclinic crystal with space group P21/m (No. 11).

Terbium(III) carbonate can be obtained by reacting terbium(III) chloride with saturated carbon dioxide solution in sodium bicarbonate, and the product also needs to be washed with water saturated with carbon dioxide. The germanates TbIII13(GeO4)6O7(OH) and K2TbIVGe2O7 can be synthesized at high temperature and pressure, and they are colorless crystals of trigonal and monoclinic systems, respectively. The tetrahydrate of terbium(III) acetate can lose hydration at 60 °C, obtaining the anhydrate at 180 °C, which starts to decompose at 220 °C, forming terbium oxide at 650 °C.

Terbium borate can be obtained by reacting terbium oxide with boric acid:
 2 Tb4O7 + 8 H3BO3 → 8 TbBO3 + 12 H2O + O2↑

The single crystal of its hexagonal phase can be obtained by the Czochralski method; it can also form a solid of the triclinic system, which can be obtained by the sol-gel method. The composite borates TbFe3(BO3)4 and TbAl3(BO3)4 can also be obtained by a similar method. Terbium(III) oxide, terbium(III) chloride and boron trioxide react in a caesium chloride solution to obtain terbium oxychloride borate Tb4O4Cl(BO3), which is a monoclinic crystal with space group P21/n. Both aluminate Tb3Al5O12 and gallate Tb3Ga5O12 can be used as magneto-optical materials.

Pnictides 

All the terbium pnictides form crystals of the cubic crystal system, with the space group of Fm3m. Terbium phosphide can be obtained by reacting sodium phosphide and anhydrous terbium(III) chloride at 700 to 800˚C. It undergoes a phase transition at 40 GPa from a NaCl-structure to a CsCl-structure. It can be sintered with zinc sulfide to make a green phosphor layer.

Alloys

Terfenol-D 

It was initially developed in the 1970s by the Naval Ordnance Laboratory in the United States. The technology for manufacturing the material efficiently was developed in the 1980s at Ames Laboratory under a U.S. Navy-funded program. It has the highest magnetostriction of any alloy, with up to 0.002 m/m at saturation. It possess nearly zero magnetocrystalline anisotropy and so exhibits very large magnetostriction at low magnetic fields. Terfenol-D is mostly used for its magnetostrictive properties, in which it changes shape when exposed to magnetic fields in a process called magnetization. Magnetic heat treatment is shown to improve the magnetostrictive properties of Terfenol-D at low compressive stress for certain ratios of Tb and Dy.

Victorium 

Victorium (also called monium, meaning "alone", because its spectral lines stood alone at the end of the ultraviolet spectrum) is an alloy of gadolinium and terbium, which was misidentified as a chemical element in 1898 by the English chemist William Crookes. He identified the new substance, based on an analysis of the unique phosphorescence and other ultraviolet-visible spectral phenomena, as a new chemical element. However, in 1905, French chemist Georges Urbain had proven that to be false, and in fact, a impurity of gadolinium and terbium.

Applications 

Terbium compounds do not have many applications. However, compounds of trivalent terbium can emit green light under excitation, such as terbium(III) oxide which can be used in cathode-ray tube televisions. Terbium compounds are also used in optics due to this property. In addition, terbium compounds have other applications. For example, TbFe2-based compounds can be used as magnetostrictive materials, dielectric Tb3Ga5O12 and Tb3Al5O12 can be used as magneto-optical materials, terbium(III) fluoride is used for the production of fluoride glasses and electroluminescent thin films and luminescent zinc sulfide and terbium gatifloxacin can be used as drugs. Terbium phosphide is a semiconductor used in high power, high frequency applications and in laser diodes and other photo diodes. CePO4:Tb (Cerium phosphate doped terbium) has potential application in biological imaging and cellular labeling.

Alloys containing terbium are used in the production of electronic devices, mostly as a component of Terfenol-D. The alloy is used in actuators, in sensors, in the SoundBug device (its first commercial application), hydraulic valve drivers and other magnetomechanical devices. It is also used in naval sonar systems. Its strain is also larger than that of another normally used material (PZT8), which allows Terfenol-D transducers to reach greater depths for ocean explorations than past transducers. Its low Young's Modulus brings some complications due to compression at large depths, which are overcome in transducer designs that may reach 1000 ft in depth and only lose a small amount of accuracy of around 1 dB. Due to its high temperature range, Terfenol-D is also useful in deep hole acoustic transducers where the environment may reach high pressure and temperatures like oil holes. Terfenol-D may also be used for hydraulic valve drivers due to its high strain and high force properties. Similarly, magnetostrictive actuators have also been considered for use in fuel injectors for diesel engines because of the high stresses that can be produced.

Pictures of terbium compounds

See also 

 Europium compounds
 Berkelium compounds (the actinide analogue of terbium)

References 

Chemical compounds by element
Articles containing video clips